Oursel-Maison is a commune in the Oise department in northern France.

Its name was spelled Ourcel-Maison until August 26, 2004.

See also
 Communes of the Oise department

References

Communes of Oise